Nikolayevka is a rural locality (a selo) and the administrative centre of Nikolayevsky Selsoviet, Sterlitamaksky District, Bashkortostan, Russia. The population was 830 as of 2010.

Geography 
It is located 30 km from Sterlitamak.

References 

Rural localities in Sterlitamaksky District